The Kleist Theater was a theatre and opera house in Frankfurt (Oder), Germany. It opened in 1945 and was named after Heinrich von Kleist (born in the city) in 1952. It closed in 2000.

External links

1945 establishments in Germany
2000 disestablishments in Germany
Former theatres in Germany
Buildings and structures in Frankfurt (Oder)
Heinrich von Kleist